Sanjay Kumar Gupta is an Indian politician from Sheohar Bihar and a member of the Bihar Legislative Assembly. Sanjay Kumar Gupta won the Belsand on the RJD ticket in the 2020 Bihar Legislative Assembly election and also won from Sheohar for periods 2003 to 2004 and 2005 to 2010 from Belsand. In 2020 Gupta won for third time as M.L.A.

References 

Living people
Bihar MLAs 2020–2025
Rashtriya Janata Dal politicians
Year of birth missing (living people)